The 2012–13 UEFA Europa League qualifying phase decided the 62 teams that would participate in the final play-off round of qualifying.

All times are CEST (UTC+2).

Round and draw dates
All draws were held at UEFA headquarters in Nyon, Switzerland.

Matches may also be played on Tuesdays or Wednesdays instead of the regular Thursdays due to scheduling conflicts.

Format
Each tie was played over two legs, with each team playing one leg at home. The team that scored more goals on aggregate over the two legs advanced to the next round. In the event that aggregate score finished level, the away goals rule would be applied, i.e., the team that scored more goals away from home over the two legs advanced. If away goals were also equal, then thirty minutes of extra time would be played, divided into two fifteen-minutes halves. The away goals rule would again be applied after extra time, i.e., if there were goals scored during extra time and the aggregate score was still level, the visiting team would advance by virtue of more away goals scored. If no goals were scored during extra time, the tie would be decided by penalty shootout.

In the draws for each round, teams were seeded based on their 2012 UEFA club coefficients, with the teams divided into seeded and unseeded pots. A seeded team was drawn against an unseeded team, with the order of legs in each tie decided randomly. Due to the limited time between matches, the draws for the second and third qualifying rounds took place before the results of the previous round were known. The seeding in these draws (or in any cases where the results of a tie in the previous round were not known at the time of draw) was carried out under the assumption that the higher-ranked teams of the previous round would advance to this round, which means if a lower-ranked team were to advance, it would simply take the seeding of its defeated opponent. Prior to the draws, UEFA may form "groups" in accordance with the principles set by the Club Competitions Committee, but they were purely for convenience of the draw and for ensuring that teams from the same association were not drawn against each other, and did not resemble any real groupings in the sense of the competition.

Teams
Below were the 168 teams involved in the qualifying phase and play-off round, grouped by their starting rounds (including 14 losing teams from the Champions League third qualifying round which entered the play-off round). The 31 winners of the play-off round qualified for the group stage to join the 7 automatic qualifiers and the 10 losing teams from the Champions League play-off round.

Notes
CL-CR Losing teams from the Champions League third qualifying round (Champions Route)
CL-LR Losing teams from the Champions League third qualifying round (League Route)

First qualifying round

Seeding

Matches

|}

Notes
Note 1: Order of legs reversed after original draw.

First leg

Notes
Note 2: Víkingur Gøta played their home match at Gundadalur, Tórshavn instead of their regular stadium, Serpugerði Stadium, Norðragøta.
Note 3: Shkëndija played their home match at Milano Arena, Kumanovo instead of their regular stadium, Gradski stadion, Tetovo.
Note 4: Narva Trans played their home match at Rakvere linnastaadion, Rakvere instead of their regular stadium, Kreenholmi Stadium, Narva.
Note 5: Renova played their home match at Milano Arena, Kumanovo instead of their regular stadium, Gradski stadion, Tetovo.
Note 6: Baku played their home match at Dalga Arena, Baku instead of their regular stadium, Tofiq Bahramov Stadium, Baku.
Note 7: Rudar Pljevlja played their home match at Gradski stadion, Nikšić instead of their regular stadium, Gradski stadion, Pljevlja.
Note 8: Differdange 03 played their home match at Stade de la Frontière, Esch-sur-Alzette instead of their regular stadium, Stade du Thillenberg, Differdange.
Note 9: Tirana played their home match at Qemal Stafa Stadium, Tirana instead of their regular stadium, Selman Stërmasi Stadium, Tirana.
Note 10: EB/Streymur played their home match at Gundadalur, Tórshavn instead of their regular stadium, Við Margáir, Streymnes.
Note 11: Cefn Druids played their home match at Racecourse Ground, Wrexham instead of their regular stadium, The Rock, Rhosymedre.

Second leg

Elfsborg won 12–0 on aggregate.

Tirana won 2–0 on aggregate.

Khazar Lankaran won 4–2 on aggregate.

Portadown won 2–1 on aggregate.

Lech Poznań won 3–1 on aggregate.

Ordabasy won 1–0 on aggregate.

Shirak won 2–1 on aggregate.

Metalurgi Rustavi won 9–1 on aggregate.

Aktobe won 2–1 on aggregate.

2–2 on aggregate. Metalurg Skopje won on away goals.

3–3 on aggregate. Gandzasar won on away goals.

3–3 on aggregate. Čelik Nikšić won on away goals.

Inter Baku won 7–0 on aggregate.

2–2 on aggregate. Levadia Tallinn won on away goals.

3–3 on aggregate. Sūduva Marijampolė won on away goals.

Gomel won 10–0 on aggregate.

Olimpija Ljubljana won 6–0 on aggregate.

Liepājas Metalurgs won 6–0 on aggregate.

MYPA won 5–0 on aggregate.

Zimbru Chișinău won 2–1 on aggregate.

Rosenborg won 4–0 on aggregate.

Kalmar FF won 4–1 on aggregate.

JJK won 4–3 on aggregate.

Senica won 3–2 on aggregate.

Differdange 03 won 6–0 on aggregate.

Sarajevo won 9–6 on aggregate.

Twente won 9–0 on aggregate.

KuPS won 3–2 on aggregate.

FH won 3–1 on aggregate.

Mura 05 won 2–0 on aggregate.

Osijek won 4–1 on aggregate.

Dacia Chișinău won 2–0 on aggregate.

Zeta won 4–2 on aggregate.

Renova won 8–0 on aggregate.

Þór Akureyri won 5–1 on aggregate.

Honvéd won 3–0 on aggregate.

2–2 on aggregate. St. Patrick's Athletic won on away goals.

Notes
Note 12: Grevenmacher played their home match at Stade Jos Nosbaum, Dudelange instead of their regular stadium, Op Flohr Stadion, Grevenmacher.
Note 13: Nõmme Kalju played their home match at Kadrioru Stadium, Tallinn instead of their regular stadium, Hiiu Stadium, Tallinn.
Note 14: Ordabasy played their home match at Central Stadium, Almaty instead of their regular stadium, Kazhimukan Munaitpasov Stadium, Shymkent.
Note 15: Metalurgi Rustavi played their home match at Mikheil Meskhi Stadium, Tbilisi instead of their regular stadium, Poladi Stadium, Rustavi.
Note 16: Metalurg Skopje played their home match at Milano Arena, Kumanovo instead of their regular stadium, Železarnica Stadium, Skopje.
Note 17: Gandzasar played their home match at Republican Stadium, Yerevan instead of their regular stadium, Gandzasar Stadium, Kapan.
Note 18: Čelik Nikšić played their home match at Gradski stadion, Nikšić instead of their regular stadium, Stadion Željezare, Nikšić.
Note 19: Inter Baku played their home match at Dalga Arena, Baku instead of their regular stadium, Shafa Stadium, Baku.
Note 20: MYPA played their home match at Lahden Stadion, Lahti instead of their regular stadium, Saviniemi, Myllykoski, Kouvola.
Note 21: NSÍ Runavík played their home match at Gundadalur, Tórshavn instead of their regular stadium, Runavík Stadium, Runavík.
Note 22: Mura 05 played their home match at Športni park, Lendava instead of their regular stadium, Fazanerija City Stadium, Murska Sobota, as it did not meet UEFA requirements.
Note 23: Zeta played their home match at Stadion Pod Goricom, Podgorica instead of their regular stadium, Stadion Trešnjica, Golubovci.

Second qualifying round

Seeding

Notes
† Winners of the previous round whose identity was not known at the time of the draw (teams in italics defeated a team with a higher coefficient in the previous round, thus effectively taking the coefficient of their opponent in the draw for this round)

Matches

|}

Notes
Note 24: Order of legs reversed after original draw.

First leg

Notes
Note 25: Naftan Novopolotsk played their home match at Central Sport Complex, Vitebsk instead of their regular stadium, Atlant Stadium, Navapolatsk.
Note 26: Anzhi Makhachkala played their home match at Saturn Stadium, Ramenskoye instead of their regular stadium, Dynamo Stadium, Makhachkala, due to security issues involving the city of Makhachkala and the autonomous republic of Dagestan.
Note 27: Renova played their home match at Milano Arena, Kumanovo instead of their regular stadium, Gradski stadion, Tetovo.
Note 28: Lokomotiv Plovdiv played their home match at Lovech Stadium, Lovech instead of their regular stadium, Lokomotiv Stadium, Plovdiv.
Note 29: Metalurgi Rustavi played their home match at Mikheil Meskhi Stadium, Tbilisi instead of their regular stadium, Poladi Stadium, Rustavi.
Note 30: Inter Baku played their home match at Dalga Arena, Baku instead of their regular stadium, Shafa Stadium, Baku.
Note 31: Differdange 03 played their home match at Stade de la Frontière, Esch-sur-Alzette instead of their regular stadium, Stade du Thillenberg, Differdange.
Note 32: Tirana played their home match at Qemal Stafa Stadium, Tirana instead of their regular stadium, Selman Stërmasi Stadium, Tirana.
Note 33: Bnei Yehuda played their home match at Ramat Gan Stadium in Tel Aviv District instead of their regular stadium, Bloomfield Stadium, Tel Aviv.
Note 34: Stadion Ruchu capacity was limited to 4,000 because of renovation works.
Note 35: Maccabi Netanya played their home match at HaMoshava Stadium, Petah Tikva instead of their regular stadium, Sar-Tov Stadium, Netanya.
Note 36: Mura 05 played their home match at Športni park, Lendava instead of their regular stadium, Fazanerija City Stadium, Murska Sobota.

Second leg

Bnei Yehuda won 3–0 on aggregate.

Rosenborg won 4–3 on aggregate.

Dila Gori won 5–2 on aggregate.

Servette won 5–1 on aggregate.

Ruch won 6–1 on aggregate.

Metalurh won 11–2 on aggregate.

2–2 on aggregate. KuPS won on away goals.

Gomel won 2–1 on aggregate.

Aktobe won 5–4 on aggregate.

Twente won 6–1 on aggregate.

Elfsborg won 2–1 on aggregate.

Vojvodina won 5–1 on aggregate.

Rapid București won 5–1 on aggregate.

Anzhi won 5–0 on aggregate.

Aalesund won 6–1 on aggregate.

Anorthosis won 6–1 on aggregate.

Kalmar won 6–1 on aggregate.

1–1 on aggregate. Mura 05 won on away goals.

2–2 on aggregate. Asteras Tripolis won 4–2 on penalties.

1–1 on aggregate. Ried won on away goals.

Tromsø won 1–0 on aggregate.

1–1 on aggregate. Young Boys won 4–1 on penalties.

Gent won 4–2 on aggregate.

APOEL won 3–0 on aggregate.

Lech Poznań won 2–1 on aggregate.

3–3 on aggregate. Zeta won on away goals.

Vitesse won 7–5 on aggregate.

Viktoria Plzeň won 5–1 on aggregate.

Spartak Trnava won 4–2 on aggregate.

Hajduk Split won 2–1 on aggregate.

Red Star Belgrade won 7–6 on aggregate.

1–1 on aggregate. Videoton won on away goals.

Legia Warsaw won 7–3 on aggregate.

Eskişehirspor won 3–1 on aggregate.

Slaven Belupo won 10–2 on aggregate.

St. Patrick's Athletic won 3–2 on aggregate.

Sarajevo won 3–2 on aggregate.

Admira Wacker Mödling won 6–2 on aggregate.

AIK won 2–1 on aggregate.

Mladá Boleslav won 4–0 on aggregate.

Notes
Note 37: Ordabasy played their home match at Central Stadium, Almaty instead of their regular stadium, Kazhimukan Munaitpasov Stadium, Shymkent.
Note 38: Dila Gori played their home match at Mikheil Meskhi Stadium, Tbilisi instead of their regular stadium, Tengiz Burjanadze Stadium, Gori.
Note 39: Gandzasar played their home match at Republican Stadium, Yerevan instead of their regular stadium, Gandzasar Stadium, Kapan.
Note 40: Metalurg Skopje played their home match at Milano Arena, Kumanovo instead of their regular stadium, Železarnica Stadium, Skopje.
Note 41: Čelik Nikšić played their home match at Gradski stadion, Nikšić instead of their regular stadium, Stadion Željezare, Nikšić.
Note 42: CSKA Sofia played their home match at Vasil Levski National Stadium, Sofia instead of their regular stadium, Balgarska Armia Stadium, Sofia, as it was undergoing renovation work.
Note 43: Zeta played their home match at Stadion Pod Goricom, Podgorica instead of their regular stadium, Stadion Trešnjica, Golubovci.

Third qualifying round

Seeding

Notes
† Winners of the previous round whose identity was not known at the time of the draw (teams in italics defeated a team with a higher coefficient in the previous round, thus effectively taking the coefficient of their opponent in the draw for this round)

Matches

|}

Notes
Note 44: UEFA awarded Mura 05 a 3–0 win due to Arsenal Kyiv fielding suspended player Éric Matoukou in the first leg. The original match had ended in a 3–0 win for Arsenal Kyiv.
Note 45: Order of legs reversed after original draw.
Note 46: The match was abandoned in the 82nd minute due to crowd disturbance. Dila Gori was leading 3–0. That result was confirmed standing by UEFA.

First leg

Notes
Note 47: Anzhi Makhachkala played their home match at Saturn Stadium, Ramenskoye instead of their regular stadium, Dynamo Stadium, Makhachkala, due to security issues involving the city of Makhachkala and the autonomous republic of Dagestan.
Note 48: Dila Gori played their home match at Mikheil Meskhi Stadium, Tbilisi instead of their regular stadium, Tengiz Burjanadze Stadium, Gori.
Note 49: Stadion Ruchu capacity was limited to 4,000 because of renovation works.
Note 50: Bnei Yehuda played their home match at Ramat Gan Stadium in Tel Aviv District instead of their regular stadium, Bloomfield Stadium, Tel Aviv.
Note 51: St. Patrick's Athletic played their home match at Tallaght Stadium, Dublin instead of their regular stadium, Richmond Park, Dublin.

Second leg

0–0 on aggregate. Red Star Belgrade won 6–5 on penalties.

Dynamo Moscow won 7–2 on aggregate.

Horsens won 4–3 on aggregate.

Genk won 4–2 on aggregate.

Athletic Bilbao won 4–3 on aggregate.

Legia Warsaw won 4–3 on aggregate.

1–1 on aggregate. Rosenborg won on away goals.

Apoel won 3–1 on aggregate.

Tromsø won 2–1 on aggregate.

Twente won 4–0 on aggregate.

Dila Gori won 3–1 on aggregate.

Videoton won 4–0 on aggregate.

Young Boys won 3–1 on aggregate.

Steaua București won 3–1 on aggregate.

AIK won 3–1 on aggregate.

2–2 on aggregate. Zeta won on away goals.

Sparta Prague won 4–2 on aggregate.

Mura 05 won 3–2 on aggregate.

Anzhi Makhachkala won 4–0 on aggregate.

Viktoria Plzeň won 7–0 on aggregate.

PAOK won 6–1 on aggregate.

Bursaspor won 6–1 on aggregate.

Hannover 96 won 5–0 on aggregate.

Heerenveen won 4–1 on aggregate.

Marseille won 4–1 on aggregate.

Internazionale won 3–2 on aggregate.

1–1 on aggregate. Marítimo won on away goals.

Liverpool won 4–0 on aggregate.

Rapid Wien won 3–2 on aggregate.

Notes
Note 52: Zeta played their home match at Stadion Pod Goricom, Podgorica instead of their regular stadium, Stadion Trešnjica, Golubovci.
Note 53: Mura 05 played their home match at Ljudski vrt, Maribor instead of their regular stadium, Fazanerija City Stadium, Murska Sobota.
Note 54: Rapid București played their home match at Arena Națională, Bucharest instead of their regular stadium, Stadionul Giulești-Valentin Stănescu, Bucharest.
Note 55: Marseille played their home match at Stade Parsemain, Istres instead of their regular stadium, Stade Vélodrome, Marseille, as it was under renovations.

Statistics
There were 757 goals in 274 matches in the qualifying phase and play-off round, for an average of 2.76 goals per match.

Top goalscorers

Top assists

References

External links
2012–13 UEFA Europa League, UEFA.com

1
UEFA Europa League qualifying rounds